Age of Pirates: Caribbean Tales, known in Russia as Corsairs III (Корсары III), is a video game developed by Akella. Due to legal issues, it does not bear the name of the developers' previous pirate games Sea Dogs or Pirates of the Caribbean. Unlike Pirates of the Caribbean, Age Of Pirates was developed with the intent of serving as a true sequel to Sea Dogs despite the name change, and chronicles the story of the children of the main character from the original. The sequel of the game was released on May 26, 2009 titled Age of Pirates 2: City of Abandoned Ships.

In 2017, the game was digitally released on GOG and Steam as Sea Dogs: Caribbean Tales.

Main characters
The player can choose whether to play as Blaze Shark or his step sister Beatrice Shark.

Gameplay
Age of Pirates Caribbean Tales plays out in several different ways. There are several different game elements both on land and sea:

1) Sailing on the map: time is sped up to compensate for the travel around the map; as the players sail around several of the Caribbean islands they can choose to enter ports, attack ships or sail through storms.

2) Sailing in real time: on the sea is where the sea battles take place, as well as real-time sailing; also sailing through storms takes place in real time.

3) On foot: there are many different things players can do on foot; a few of these are fighting in boarding actions, fighting a captain one-on-one, and walking around town gathering sailors and supplies.

Reception

IGN Spain's David Soriano criticized the Spanish dub of the game by ranking it one of the ten worst video games dub for the Spanish language and calling it the worst dubbing for a video game, at least in Spain. He commented: "We do not know what kind of substances were in the study [in which the game was dubbed]".

References

External links
 IGN page
 Gamespot 
 Playlogic International

2006 video games
1C Company games
Age of Discovery video games
Windows games
Windows-only games
Role-playing video games
Video games about pirates
Video games developed in Russia
Video games set in the Caribbean
Trade simulation games
Playlogic Entertainment games
Akella games